Clinical Pediatrics is a peer-reviewed medical journal of pediatrics that was established in 1962. It is published monthly by SAGE Publications and edited by Brian S. Carter.

Scope 
Clinical Pediatrics is a medical journal that seeks to publish and to accessible information on a variety of child-centered care topics including those of a clinical, scientific, behavioral, educational, or ethical nature.

Abstracting and indexing 
Clinical Pediatrics is abstracted and indexed in, among other databases:  SCOPUS, and the Social Sciences Citation Index. According to the Journal Citation Reports, its 2018 impact factor is 1.383, ranking it 78 out of 125 journals in the category ‘Pediatrics’.

References 

 "Journals Ranked by Impact: Pediatrics". 2017 Journal Citation Reports. Web of Science (Science ed.). Clarivate Analytics. 2017.

External links 
 

Pediatrics journals
SAGE Publishing academic journals
Monthly journals
English-language journals
Publications established in 1962